Azis Efendi Gjirokastra was one of the delegates of the Albanian Declaration of Independence.

References

Year of death missing
Year of birth missing
All-Albanian Congress delegates